People Don't Stop Believin' is an Ian McNabb album compiling demos, B-sides, and versions of songs from the recording sessions of Before All of This. It was predominantly on sale as a digital download rather than a physical album.

Track listing
 "Let The Young Girl Do What She Wants to Do" [Demo]	 [3:24]
 "Picture of the Moon" [Alternate 'loud guitars' mix]	 [2:38]
 "Message From the Country" [B-side]	 [3:32]
 "The New Me" [Early version]	 [4:33]
 "They Shoot Horses Don't They" [B-side]	 [3:53]
 "People Don't Stop Believin'" [Previously unreleased song]	 [7:59]
 "They Will Find You Out" [B-side]	 [4:17]
 "The Absentee" [Previously unreleased song]	 [6:08]
 "The Nicest Kind of Lie" [Early version]	 [4:04]
 "The Lonely Ones" [1][Clean vocal]	 [3:37]
 "Finally Getting Over You" [Band take]	 [3:10]
 "Let The Young Girl Do What She Wants To" [Single version]	 [2:52]

References

2005 compilation albums
Ian McNabb albums